In enzymology, an aspartate—tRNA ligase is an enzyme that catalyzes the chemical reaction

ATP + L-aspartate + tRNAAsp  AMP + diphosphate + L-aspartyl-tRNAAsp

The 3 substrates of this enzyme are ATP, L-aspartate, and tRNA(Asp), whereas its 3 products are AMP, diphosphate, and L-aspartyl-tRNA(Asp).

This enzyme belongs to the family of ligases, to be specific those forming carbon-oxygen bonds in aminoacyl-tRNA and related compounds.  The systematic name of this enzyme class is L-aspartate:tRNAAsp ligase (AMP-forming). Other names in common use include aspartyl-tRNA synthetase, aspartyl ribonucleic synthetase, aspartyl-transfer RNA synthetase, aspartic acid translase, aspartyl-transfer ribonucleic acid synthetase, and aspartyl ribonucleate synthetase.  This enzyme participates in alanine and aspartate metabolism and aminoacyl-trna biosynthesis.

Structural studies

See also
DARS (gene)

References

 
 

EC 6.1.1
Enzymes of known structure